The Great American Conference women's basketball tournament is the annual conference women's basketball championship tournament for the Great American Conference.

The tournament has been held annually since 2012, one year after the conference was initially founded. It is a single-elimination tournament and seeding is based on regular season records.

The winner receives the conference's automatic bid to the NCAA Division II women's basketball tournament.

Southwestern Oklahoma State have won the most tournaments (four).

Results

Championship records

 East Central, Henderson State, Northwestern Oklahoma State, Oklahoma Baptist, Ouachita Baptist, and Southern Arkansas have not yet reached the tournament final

See also
 Great American Conference men's basketball tournament

References

NCAA Division II women's basketball conference tournaments
Basketball Tournament, Women's
Recurring sporting events established in 2012